Charles-Remy Rakotonirina (born 1928 in Fianarantsoa) was a Malagasy clergyman and prelate for the Roman Catholic Diocese of Farafangana. He was appointed bishop in 1976. He died in 2005.

References 

1928 births
2005 deaths
Malagasy Roman Catholic bishops